Weingard is a surname. Notable people with the surname include:

Robbie Weingard (born 1963), American basketball player
Robert Weingard, American philosopher of science